The promenade position (abbreviated as PP in dance diagrams) is a dance position in ballroom and other dances. It is described differently in various dance categories.

Connection
The promenade position is a "V" shaped dance position with the man's right hip and the woman's left hip in contact at the point of the "V", and with the man's left side and the woman's right side slightly open.  The direction of travel is toward the openside.

The man and woman stand in front of each other in body contact, slightly offset to the left, with the middle of the woman's front connected to the man's right front. The connection begins at the upper thighs and should continue all of the way up to the middle of the torso. The man's left hand holds the woman’s right hand, palm to palm in an upper-hand clasp, with fingers and thumbs closed around partner's hand. The man's right hand must rest on the woman’s back, loosely cupped with fingers and thumb together (not spread apart). The man's hand connects to her back on her shoulder blade. His wrist should make contact with her underarm at the junction of her arm and body. This connection should not change from the basic closed position. The woman’s left hand and forearm must be on the man's upper arm. This connection should also not change from the basic closed position.

Ballroom
In ballroom dances their common trait is that when in promenade position, the dance couple moves (or intends to move) essentially sidewise to the leader's left while partners nearly face each other. Steps of both partners are basically sidewise or diagonally forward with respect to their bodies. Normally the dancers look in the direction of the intended movement.

International Standard / American Smooth
In the International Standard and  American Smooth dance categories the promenade position is described as a "V" shaped dance position with the man's right hip and the woman’s left hip in contact at the point of the "V".  The dancer's heads face the open portion of the "V".  The intended direction of movement is in this direction as well, with some exceptions. 

In International Standard, many pota ballroom partners strive to keep their shoulder lines close to parallel throughout a promenade, by means of an internal rotational stretch which is one of the more elusive dance concepts.  Some expansion of the hold may often be seen, in the form of the leader stretching diagonally forwards and the follower diagonally back, each of course retaining their own largely independent balance.  Diagonal movement across the feet and placement of the step of the inside foot into Contra body movement position may reduce the amount of hip turnout required for free movement. With proper foot usage, no sacrifice of motion is required to maintain this position. At the same time other skilled dancers often sacrifice the "narrowness" of the V-shape in favor of the amount of the progressive movement 

Some dance moves started from the PP are Chasse, weave, and several others whose description includes the words "from PP", e.g., "Cross Hesitation from PP".

Some dance moves that may end in the PP are Open Telemark, Chasse

Latin / Rhythm 
International Latin and American Rhythm dance categories usually do not involve the immediate body contact, but the general relative body positions are basically the same as described above, only the shoulder lines may remain parallel, i.e., one usually do not speak of "V"-shaped bodies position.

Some dance moves that may involve the PP are Botafogos (Samba) and Travelling Spins (Paso Doble).

Square and line dancing, Country/Western

In square dances the promenade is a side-by-side position, with the intention to move together forward.

The dancers may use various promenade handholds. Some of them are:
 Basic promenade or Skirt Skater's handhold: The woman extends her left hand horizontally, palm down, across the front of the gent, and he takes it in his left hand. The woman places her right hand at the right side of her waist or slightly behind her right hip, and the gent holds this hand loosely with his right hand. The woman might also use her right hand to hold on to a full skirt with petticoats, sway the skirt in time to the music as a flourish (“skirtwork”), or simply place her hand on her waist. In this case, the gent places his right hand on the small of her back.
 Skater’s handhold:  Both hands are held in front of the partners at waist-level.  The left hands are held in front of the gent’s waist; the right hands are held in front of the woman’s waist.  The gent’s right arm crosses in front of the lady’s left arm.
 Varsouvienne handhold (also called Shadow, Horseshoe, Cape Position): The man holds the woman's left hand with his left hand in front of her left shoulder. The man crosses his right arm behind the woman and holds her right hand with his right hand in front of the woman's right shoulder. The man's arm is held just above the woman's shoulder.
 Cuddle or Wrap Position (also called Sweetheart or Sweetheart’s Wrap):  The gent wraps his right arm around the woman’s waist; she wraps her left arm around her front to hold his right hand.  She wraps her right arm over her left arm and across her front to hold his left hand.  Hands are at waist level.

Lindy Hop

In Lindy Hop, the promenade position is often defined similarly to the square dancing version: it is a side-by-side position with the leader's  right arm on the follower's right shoulder, see, e.g., Lindy Basic.

See also
Promenade
Counter promenade position

Partner dance technique